Prices Corners may refer to: 

A community within East Garafraxa, Dufferin County, Southern Ontario, Canada
A community within Oro-Medonte, Simcoe County, Southern Ontario, Canada

See also
Prices Corner, Delaware, United States